SS T. A. Johnston was a Liberty ship built in the United States during World War II. She was named after T. A. Johnston.

Construction
T. A. Johnston was initially laid down on 22 April 1944, under a Maritime Commission (MARCOM) contract, MC hull 2304, by J.A. Jones Construction, Panama City, Florida.  A fire on the slip way warped the original hull and it had to be scrapped. A new hull was laid down on 14 November 1944, and would go on to set a shipyard record of 29 days on the way when she was launched on 13 December 1944.

History
She was allocated to J.H. Winchester & Company, Inc., on 28 December 1944. On 7 January 1947, she was laid up in the National Defense Reserve Fleet, in the Hudson River Group. On 19 July 1955, she was withdrawn from the fleet to be loaded with grain as part of the "Grain Program 1955". She returned to the fleet on 4 August 1955, full of grain. On 22 April 1956, she was withdrawn to unload, she returned empty on 28 April 1956. On 4 August 1956, she was withdrawn for the last time to be loaded with grain, she returned full on 25 August 1956. She was withdrawn on May 18 1963, to be emptied and returned 25 May 1963. On 10 July 1970, she was sold, along with one other ship, for $80,323.08 to Union Minerals and Alloys Corporation, to be scrapped. She was removed from the fleet on 6 October 1970.

References

Bibliography

 
 
 
 
 

 

Liberty ships
Ships built in Panama City, Florida
1944 ships
Hudson River Reserve Fleet
Hudson River Reserve Fleet Grain Program